Marietta High School may refer to one of three public schools in the U.S.:

Marietta High School (Georgia) in Marietta, Georgia
Marietta High School (Ohio) in Marietta, Ohio
Marrietta High School (Oklahoma) in Marietta, Oklahoma